The Second Orban cabinet was the government of Romania until the 2020 legislative elections. It was a minority administration led by Ludovic Orban, the leader of the National Liberal Party (PNL), who received the support of a parliamentary majority on 14 March 2020 and entered office the same day. It included a wide de facto confidence-and-supply with the other parties, in the outbreak of the COVID-19 pandemic.

On 14 March 2020, the cabinet hearings and vote took place in special conditions, due to the suspicion that Senator Vergil Chițac [ro], who tested positive for COVID-19, infected the National Liberal Party (PNL) leadership, as well as some fellow senators. The same day the Cabinet was sworn in at Cotroceni Palace in special conditions.

References 

Government of Romania
2020 establishments in Romania
Cabinets established in 2020
Cabinets disestablished in 2020
2020 disestablishments in Romania
2020 in Romania